Populus guzmanantlensis is a species of plant in the family Salicaceae. It is endemic to Mexico. This species is native to the Sierra de Manantlán of Jalisco.

References

guzmanantlensis
Endemic flora of Mexico
Flora of Jalisco
Endangered plants
Endangered biota of Mexico
Trees of Jalisco
Taxonomy articles created by Polbot